The Lincoln Cliff or Lincoln Edge is a portion of a major escarpment that runs north–south through Lindsey and Kesteven in central Lincolnshire and is a prominent landscape feature in a generally flat portion of the county.  Towards its northern end, near Scunthorpe, it is sometimes referred to as the Trent Cliff. The name preserves an obsolete sense of the word "cliff", which could historically refer to a hillside as well as a precipitous rock face.

Description
The scarp is formed by resistant Jurassic age rocks, principally the Lincolnshire Limestone Formation, and is remarkable for its length and straightness. However it is modest in height, rising about 50 metres or less above the surrounding landscape. It runs for over 50 miles from the Leicestershire border near Grantham to the Humber Estuary, and is broken only twice by river gaps at Ancaster and Lincoln, through which the rivers Slea and Witham respectively flow.

To the west of the Cliff north of Lincoln lies the River Trent, with the valley of the Witham to the west south of Lincoln. The top of the Cliff is followed by two historically significant roads. Closely following the escarpment is an ancient trackway, loosely known as the Jurassic Way, which in large parts now consists of the A607 south of Lincoln and the B1398 to the north. The second road is the Roman Ermine Street that runs parallel a few miles to the east of the Edge.

North of Lincoln, the name Lincoln Cliff, or simply the Cliff, is locally used to refer to the entire ridge of Jurassic Limestone, not just its steep western scarp. This can be seen in placenames such as Welton Cliff, Saxby Cliff and Caenby Cliff, reflecting parish-based divisions of the ridge. This use of the name is not found south of Lincoln, where the term Cliff refers only to the scarp itself, as distinct from the limestone plateau (which is here called the Lincoln Heath). To minimise confusion, some people prefer the name Lincoln Edge or Lincolnshire Edge for the scarp that runs from Grantham to the Humber, reserving the name Lincoln Cliff for the section of limestone ridge north of Lincoln.

Geology
One of several west-facing scarps within the county, Lincoln Cliff or Edge is formed from a series of sedimentary rocks which dip very gently to the east. The older rocks to the west of the scarp are of Early Jurassic age whilst those to the east are of Middle Jurassic origin;
Inferior Oolite Group (Middle Redbourne Group)(Middle Jurassic epoch)
Lincolnshire Limestone Formation (Lincolnshire Limestone)
Grantham Formation (Lower Estuarine Beds) / Northampton Sand Formation
Lias Group (Lower Jurassic epoch)
Whitby Mudstone Formation (Upper Lias or Coleby Mudstones)
Marlstone Rock Formation (Marlstone Rock Bed)
Charmouth Mudstone Formation (Middle Lias or Coleby Mudstones)

Parts of this sequence of rocks have gone by different names in the past indicated above by italicised names in brackets, and these continue to be found in older geological literature and maps. The Charmouth Mudstones form the lower ground to the west and the lowest part of the "cliff" whilst the Lincolnshire Limestone forms the plateau surface to the east of the scarp. 

The two gaps in the ridge at Lincoln and at Ancaster are interpreted as indicating the former course of the eastward flowing proto-Trent. The river flowed from the Nottingham area towards the North Sea via the Vale of Belvoir and the gap in the ridge at Ancaster. At a later stage it used the Lincoln Gap before assuming its present northerly course to join with the Yorkshire Ouse to form the Humber.

List of cliff villages

From north to south the "towns, villages and city (Lincoln)" are as follows along the cliff:

 Winteringham, on the bank of the Humber
 Winterton
 Roxby
 Burton upon Stather
 Scunthorpe (Town)
 Kirton in Lindsey (Town)
 Grayingham
 Blyborough
 Willoughton
 Hemswell
 Harpswell
 Glentworth
 Fillingham
 Ingham
 Cammeringham
 Brattleby
 Aisthorpe
 Welton Cliff
 Welton
 Scampton
 North Carlton
 South Carlton
 Burton by Lincoln
 Lincoln – break in the Edge (River Witham) (City)
 Canwick
 Bracebridge Heath
 Waddington
 Harmston
 Coleby
 Boothby Graffoe
 Navenby
 Wellingore
 Welbourn
 Leadenham
 Fulbeck
 Caythorpe
 Normanton
 Carlton Scroop
 Ancaster – break in the Edge (River Slea)
 Honington
 Barkston
 Syston
 Belton
 Londonthorpe
 Manthorpe
 Grantham (Town)

References

External links

Escarpments of England
Ridges of England
Landforms of Lincolnshire